Huaral is a town in central Peru, capital of the Huaral Province in the Department of Lima.

Etymology
Regarding the origin of the word huaral, there are two hypotheses:

 The first corresponds to historian Jesus Elias Ipinze, who affirms that the word huaral, comes from the name of a main cacique of the town called Martín Guaral Paico, in the middle of the 16th century. From what it follows, guaral would have subsequently derived in huaral.

 The second hypothesis corresponds to archaeologist Julio C. Tello, who visited Huaral, for reasons of carrying out archaeological investigations. Tello affirms that the name of Huaral comes from the corruption of the Aymara words huaralí, huararo, huararí or huallalí.

Geography

The territory of the city includes the coastal strip comprising all the Chancay valley to the high peaks of Vichaycocha, the source of the Chackal or Pasacmayo "Moon River".

History
Before the arrival of the Spanish, the town was a community of ayllus, that the Spanish called "Guaral Viejo".

Huaral was founded on March 21, 1551 by the Spanish, being Viceroy of Peru Antonio de Mendoza, as "Settlement of the Indies". By then, the name of the town was "San Juan de Guaral". After the establishment, its hegemony became more solid and dedicated from then to agriculture, achieving in the course of the colony commercial development.

However, it was dependent as an annex of Chancay but as time passed, its natural progress placed the town in the capacity to become independent from Chancay, a situation that was recognized by President Remigio Morales Bermúdez who decrees the creation of San Juan de Huaral on October 31, 1890. Nevertheless, the installation of the first municipality took place on April 1, 1893, three years after the town's creation.

References

Populated places in the Lima Region
1551 establishments in the Spanish Empire